Scévole de Sainte-Marthe (2 February 1536 – 29 March 1623) was a French poet, born in Loudun.

Publications 
Les Œuvres
Larmes à la mémoire du très chrétien roi de France et de Pologne
Scaevolae Sammarthini Poemata et Elogia Collecta nunc in unum corpus, & ab auctore partim aucta, partim recognita
La Manière de nourrir les enfants à la mamelle
Éloges des hommes illustres, qui depuis un siècle ont fleuri en France dans la profession des Lettres

1536 births
1623 deaths
People from Loudun
French poets
16th-century French writers
16th-century male writers
17th-century French writers
17th-century French male writers
Writers from Nouvelle-Aquitaine
French male poets